The 2018 Walsall Council election took place on 3 May 2018, to elect members of Walsall Council in England. This was on the same day as other local elections.

Result

Candidates

Aldridge Central and South

Alridge North and Walsall Wood

Bentley and Darlaston North

Birchills-Leamore

Blakenall

Bloxwich East

Bloxwich West

Brownhills

Darlaston South

Paddock

Palfrey

Pelsall

Pheasey Park Farm

Pleck

Rushall-Shelfield

Short Heath

St Matthews

Streetly

Willenhall North

Willenhall South

References

Walsall
2018
2010s in the West Midlands (county)